Ulrich Aumayer, O.F.M. or Ulrich Aumair (died 1468) was a Roman Catholic prelate who served as Auxiliary Bishop of Regensburg (1456–1468).

Biography
Ulrich Aumayer was ordained a priest in the Order of Friars Minor. On 3 Jul 1456, he was appointed during the papacy of Pope Callixtus III as Auxiliary Bishop of Regensburg and Titular Bishop of Hierapolis in Isauria.. He served as Auxiliary Bishop of Regensburg until his death on 1 Jul 1468.. 

While bishop, he was the principal co-consecrator of Wilhelm von Reichenau, Bishop of Eichstätt (1464) and Jodok Seitz, Auxiliary Bishop of Augsburg (1464)

See also 
Catholic Church in Germany

References 

15th-century Roman Catholic bishops in Bavaria
Bishops appointed by Pope Callixtus III
1468 deaths
Franciscan bishops